Kot pri Rakitnici is a small settlement west of the village of Rakitnica in the Municipality of Ribnica in southern Slovenia. The area is part of the traditional region of Lower Carniola and is now included in the Southeast Slovenia Statistical Region.

Name
The name of the settlement was changed from Kot to Kot pri Rakitnici in 1953.

References

External links
Kot pri Rakitnici on Geopedia

Populated places in the Municipality of Ribnica